HT Motorsports was an American truck racing team from Martinsville, Virginia, owned by trucking company owner Jim Harris. It fielded entries for the nine years in the Camping World Truck Series before suspending operations early in 2010.

Truck No. 24 history
This team debuted at a test session at Homestead-Miami Speedway as the No. 92 with Terry Cook driving. He started fifteenth and finished 20th. The No. 24 originally was intended to be the No. 11 Toyota   for Red Horse Racing but driver David Starr and Zachry Holdings parted ways with the team in December. This team became the No. 24 for 2009 and Starr had fourteen top-ten finishes. Zachry and Starr left the team after the 2009 season for Randy Moss Motorsports.

Truck No. 25 history
HT Motorsports made its NASCAR debut at New Hampshire International Speedway in 2001 as the No. 92 Learnframe Dodge. It made four starts that season with Stacy Compton and finished in the top ten in each race.

The team then ran at Martinsville Speedway in 2002 as the No. 17 Duck Head Footwear Dodge Ram driven by Darrell Waltrip. He qualified eighteenth but finished thirty-eighth. Waltrip returned at Indianapolis Raceway Park with Tide sponsorship, and finished sixth. Stacy Compton would drive three additional races that season, posting a best finish of eighth at Richmond.

In 2003, HT switched to the No. 59 and hired Robert Pressley to drive. Driving with associate sponsorship from Melling Engine Parts, Pressley finished in the top-five four times and finished thirteenth in points. Randy LaJoie ran the first two races of 2004, followed by rookie Mark McFarland. McFarland finished sixth at Mansfield Motorsports Speedway before being cycled out by LaJoie, who had an eighth-place finish at Gateway. Andy Houston drove for three races, but did not finish higher than 14th. Sammy Sanders, Bobby Hamilton Jr., and Scott Lynch finished out the year in the 59.

Pressley returned to HT in 2005, but had only three top-ten finishes and finished 20th in the standings. He was released and replaced by Mike Wallace at the beginning of 2006, but wrecked out of the two races in which he drove for the team. Steve Park became the team's new driver, as the team switched to Ford. Despite a tenth-place finish at Mansfield, he was released after ten races and replaced by Chad Chaffin. After a slow start, the team switched to Toyota and Chaffin finished eighth at Talladega Superspeedway. Terry Cook was named the driver of the 59 for 2007, and had two top-tens and finished fourteenth in points. He was released at the end of the season for Whelen Modified driver Donny Lia, who raced the last race of the season.

For 2008, Ted Musgrave will move to the No. 59 team, bringing along his ASE sponsorship. In August 2008 ASE announced they will be leaving NASCAR. After 18 races in season, and a wreck in the 1st practice at Las Vegas Motor Speedway, Musgrave & HT Motorsports parted ways. Stacy Compton replaced him later in the day. Joey Logano made his truck series debut at Talladega starting sixth but crashing early. Terry Cook, recently released from Wyler Racing, drove the No. 59 for the rest of the '08 season. The team switched to the No. 25 for 2009 with Cook returning. He had nine top-tens but was replaced in the final two races by Mike Bliss.

References

External links 
 Official Website

American auto racing teams
Companies based in Virginia
Defunct NASCAR teams
Auto racing teams established in 2001
Sports clubs disestablished in 2010